Joseph William "Joe" Mombourquette (September 9, 1922 – November 27, 2007) was a member of the Canadian Armed Forces and political figure in New Brunswick. He represented Oromocto in the Legislative Assembly of New Brunswick from 1982 to 1987.

Biography 
He was born in Lower L'Ardoise, Cape Breton Island, Nova Scotia, the son of Anthony Mombourquette and Clara Sampson. He was a member of the Canadian Army for 32 years, serving during World War II and the Korean War. He received a B.A. from Saint Francis Xavier University in 1952. Later that year, Mombourquette married Theresa Marion Clannon. He retired from the army in 1973 at the rank of captain and went on to work in Manpower offices in New Brunswick. He was a member of the province's Executive Council as Minister of Labour and Human Resources and then Minister of Labour. After he retired from politics, Mombourquette served with the Canadian Employment and Immigration Commission for ten years. He has loads of grandchildren and great children currently, and his wife is passing away.

References 
 Premier's message on death of Joe Mombourquette, New Brunswick
 Obituary for the Hon. Joseph William Mombourquette

1922 births
2007 deaths
Progressive Conservative Party of New Brunswick MLAs
People from Cape Breton Island
St. Francis Xavier University alumni
Canadian military personnel from New Brunswick
Canadian military personnel of the Korean War
Canadian Army personnel of World War II
Canadian Army officers